Joseph Jude Drouin (born October 28, 1948) is a Canadian former professional ice hockey forward. He helped the New York Islanders reach the NHL playoff semifinals three-straight seasons from 1975 to 1977.

Early life
Drouin was born in Murdochville, Quebec. As a youth, he played in the 1961 Quebec International Pee-Wee Hockey Tournament with Murdochville. Drouin was drafted in the third round (17th overall) of the 1966 NHL Amateur Draft by the Montreal Canadiens. He played for their junior team, the Montreal Junior Canadiens of the Ontario Hockey Association (OHA) in the 1966–67 season, playing in 47 games and recording 32 goals and 36 assists.

Career 
Drouin turned professional with the Houston Apollos of the Central Hockey League (CHL), scoring 68 points in 60 games, and earning his first NHL playing time with the Canadiens in the 1968–69 season. The 1969–70 season found Drouin in the minors again, this time for the powerhouse Nova Scotia Voyageurs, where he dominated with 106 points in 65 games, winning the Dudley "Red" Garrett Memorial Award for rookie of the year and leading the American Hockey League (AHL) in scoring.

With no place for him in the powerful Montreal lineup, Drouin was traded to the Minnesota North Stars for the 1970–71 season, and he became one of the team's early stars, scoring 68 points and adding 12 points in 12 games in the playoffs. Drouin was a mainstay of the North Stars for four and a half seasons in all, his best season coming in 1972–73, when he scored career highs of 27 goals and 73 points.

His production fell thereafter, and he was traded in mid-season in 1975 to the New York Islanders. The trade rejuvenated Drouin, and he was an effective two-way player for three seasons with the up-and-coming Islanders.

Drouin's production sharply dropped in the 1977–78 season, and disgruntled with his declining role with the Islanders, he sat out the following season in order to become a free agent. He signed with the Winnipeg Jets thereafter, but retired early in the 1980–81 season.

Career statistics

Regular season and playoffs

References

External links
 

1948 births
Living people
Canadian ice hockey centres
Canadian ice hockey coaches
Houston Apollos players
Ice hockey people from Quebec
Minnesota North Stars players
Montreal Canadiens draft picks
Montreal Canadiens players
Montreal Voyageurs players
New York Islanders players
People from Gaspésie–Îles-de-la-Madeleine
Winnipeg Jets (1979–1996) players
Winnipeg Jets (1972–1996) coaches